2005–06 Pirveli Liga was the 17th season of the Georgian Pirveli Liga.

League standings

See also
2005–06 Umaglesi Liga
2005–06 Georgian Cup

External links
Georgia 2005/06 RSSSF

Erovnuli Liga 2 seasons
2
Georgia